John Newcombe and Tony Roche were the defending champions but only Newcombe competed that year with Vitas Gerulaitis.

Gerulaitis and Newcombe lost in the first round to Rod Frawley and Francisco González.

Frawley and González won the final by default after Vijay Amritraj and Pat Du Pré withdrew.

Seeds

  Ion Țiriac /  Guillermo Vilas (semifinals)
  Ross Case /  Geoff Masters (quarterfinals)
  Mark Edmondson /  John Marks (first round)
 N/A

Draw

External links
1979 Custom Credit Australian Indoor Championships Doubles Draw

Doubles